"Uma to Shika" (馬と鹿, Horse and Deer) is the 10th single by Kenshi Yonezu. It was released on September 11, 2019.

Background
"Uma to Shika" is the theme song of TBS television drama No Side Manager. The single features two B-side songs: "Spirits of the Sea" (海の幽霊, Umi no Yūrei), used as the theme song of Children of the Sea, and "Deshomasho" (でしょましょ, Probably).

The title of the song (馬と鹿- "Uma to shika") stands for a word game by putting apart Two kanjis of the word "baka" (馬鹿- "Stupid") with the particle "to" (と- and) to make the phrase horse and deer.

Preview events were held for "Spirits of the Sea" and "Uma to Shika".

Track listing
All music composed by Kenshi Yonezu.

Charts

References

2019 singles
2019 songs
Kenshi Yonezu songs
Billboard Japan Hot 100 number-one singles
Japanese television drama theme songs